Trane is a manufacturer of heating, ventilation, and air conditioning (HVAC) systems, along with building management systems and controls. The company is a subsidiary of Trane Technologies, a company focused on manufacturing HVAC and refrigeration systems.

History 

In 1885, James Trane, a Norwegian immigrant from Tromsø, opened his own plumbing and pipe-fitting shop in La Crosse, Wisconsin. He designed a new type of low-pressure steam heating system, Trane vapor heating. Reuben Trane, James' son, earned a mechanical engineering degree (B. S. 1910) at the University of Wisconsin–Madison and joined his father's plumbing firm.

In 1913, James and Reuben incorporated The Trane Company. By 1916, the Trane's were no longer in the plumbing business, but instead focused their attention on manufacturing heating products. Reuben's invention of the convector radiator in 1923, which replaced the heavy, bulky, cast-iron radiators that prevailed at the time, was a major success. Trane's first air conditioning unit was developed in 1931.

In 1982, Trane purchased General Electric's Central Air Conditioning Division. With that purchase came many of the most recognizable traits of Trane's residential air conditioning products. Many of those traits, like the distinctive red "Climatuff" compressors, rotary compressors, the "Spine-Fin" all aluminum spiny outdoor coil and the all aluminum evaporator coil, are still found in Trane's residential equipment lines.

In 1984, Trane was acquired by the American Standard Companies.

On February 1, 2007, American Standard Companies announced it would break up its three divisions. The company sold off its namesake kitchen and bath division and spun off WABCO, American Standard's vehicle controls division, while retaining Trane. American Standard then renamed itself Trane Inc. effective November 28, 2007.

On December 17, 2007, Trane announced it had agreed to be acquired by Ireland-based Ingersoll Rand in a cash and stock transaction. The sale was completed on June 5, 2008.

In September 2017, the Asthma and Allergy Foundation of America and Allergy Standards Limited announced that the Trane CleanEffects whole home air cleaner  earned the Asthma and Allergy Friendly Certification, the first whole home air cleaner to receive this certification.

In 2020, Ingersoll Rand spun off its non-refrigeration businesses and was rebranded as Trane Technologies.

Europe's largest cooling system 

The Channel Tunnel is a  rail tunnel beneath the English Channel, linking the United Kingdom with France. At , the tunnel has the longest undersea portion of any tunnel in the world. As well as making the trains "unbearably warm" for passengers this also presented a risk of equipment failure and track distortion. The network—Europe's largest cooling system—was supplied by eight York Titan chillers running on R22, a Hydrochlorofluorocarbon (HCFC) refrigerant gas.

Due to R22's ozone depletion potential (ODP) and high global warming potential (GWP), its use is being phased out in developed countries, and since 1 January 2015 it has been illegal in Europe to use HCFCs to service air-conditioning equipment—broken equipment that used HCFCs must instead be replaced with equipment that does not use it. In 2016, Trane was selected to provide replacement chillers for the tunnel's cooling network. The York chillers were decommissioned and four "next generation" Trane Series E CenTraVac large-capacity (2600 kW to 14,000 kW) chillers were installed—two located in Sangatte, France, and two at Shakespeare Cliff, UK.

Notable Trane buildings 
The list of buildings below use Trane systems.
Channel Tunnel, between England and France
Musée d'Orsay, Paris, France
Warsaw Financial Center, Warsaw, Poland
Australian Securities Exchange, Melbourne, Australia
The Kremlin, Moscow, Russia
La Scala Opera House, Milan, Italy
McCormick Place Convention Center, Chicago, Illinois
Athens Olympic Sports Complex, Athens, Greece
SeaWorld, Orlando, Florida
Rogers Centre, Toronto, Canada
Statue of Liberty, New York City, New York
Farragut Technical Analysis Center, Washington, D.C.
Washington Monument, Washington, D.C.
World Trade Center, Beijing, China
Burj Khalifa, Dubai, UAE

Manufacturing locations

Commercial products 
Bangkok, Thailand
Charlotte, North Carolina
Charmes, Vosges, France
Clarksville, Tennessee
Columbia, South Carolina
Forsyth, Georgia
Fort Smith, Arkansas
Epinal, France
Golbey, France
La Crosse, Wisconsin
Lexington, Kentucky (Closed in 2019)
Lynn Haven, Florida
Macon, Georgia
Penang, Malaysia
Pueblo, Colorado
Rockingham, North Carolina
Rushville, Indiana
Sao Paulo, Brazil
St. Paul, Minnesota
Taicang, China
Yangmei, Taiwan
Waco, Texas
Araucaria, Brazil

Residential products 
Monterrey, Mexico – Products made include strip heaters, plant code X
Trenton, New Jersey – Products made include gas furnaces & coils, plant code G
Tyler, Texas – Products made include unitary air conditioners & heat pumps, plant code F
Vidalia, Georgia – Products made include air handlers & coils, plant code V
Chennai, India closed now

Brands 
 Trane
 American Standard Heating and Cooling
Oxbox
RunTru
Ameristar

References 

Trane Technologies
Heating, ventilation, and air conditioning companies
Electronics companies established in 1913
2008 mergers and acquisitions
La Crosse, Wisconsin